The Swift Current 57's (formerly the Swift Current Indians) are a baseball team based in Swift Current, Saskatchewan, Canada. The team is a member of the Western Canadian Baseball League (WCBL), a collegiate summer baseball league operating in the prairie provinces of Canada.

History

Organized baseball has been played in Swift Current since at least 1908 as the city was represented in the Western Saskatchewan League that season. The 1909 Swift Current baseball team was crowned Amateur Champions of Saskatchewan and toured North Dakota, Minnesota and Iowa. In 1959 The Swift Current Indians joined the Southern Baseball League and also won their first league championship. The Indians captured four Southern Baseball League championships and were one of the six founding members of the Saskatchewan Major Baseball League (SMBL) in 1975. This new league was effectively a merger of the Southern Baseball League and the Northern Saskatchewan Baseball League. The team however only played one year before requesting a leave of absence from the league in 1976. The current team returned to the league in c.1986. Swift Current was SMBL champions six times in the last nine years under the SMBL name. In 2001 the league was renamed the Western Major Baseball League to reflect its expansion into Alberta. The Indians have won six WMBL championships, most recently in 2017.

In a website press release dated September 1, 2016, the team officially notified the Western Major Baseball League of its intent to change the name and branding to a yet-to-be-determined name and logo. Long time Swift Current player/coach Harv Martinez explained that the new name would reflect the evolving focus and standards of the organization as community leaders, stating: "The tradition and passion for baseball in this region will still be strong and vibrant. The new direction in creating a new nickname allows for us re-brand our product and promote the team in a more current and sensitive manner.”

On January 10, 2017, the Swift Current baseball club re-branded itself as the 57's. The new brand honours 57 years of Swift Current Indians baseball, although moving away from a name deemed too controversial for the twenty-first century.

See also
List of baseball teams in Canada

References

External links
 Official web site

Baseball teams in Saskatchewan
Swift Current